Voronezh Peter the Great Airport  is an International airport in Russia located 11 km north of Voronezh. Serves the city of Voronezh, Lipetsk, Tambov, Oryol, Belgorod, Kursk regions.

History
On 10 July 1933, open regular air service on the route Moscow - Voronezh - Stalingrad on multi-seat aircraft K-5.

In 1971, a new airport terminal was built and delivered.

In the 1980s and up to the collapse of the Soviet Union, the airport served 1.1 million passengers a year. In 2018, the airport handled 770,000 passengers.

In 2008, the reconstruction of the airport was initiated. The plans for the renovation included the replacement cover and lengthening the runway to 2,600 meters (over 2,600 m extension difficult, because on the one hand the airport borders on the federal highway M4, and on the other a ravine in front of the Voronezh Reservoir).

Replacement of perimeter fence, water and drainage systems, upgrading lighting equipment, reconstruction of the apron and taxiways and the airport complex. Since 2010, after the end of major works on the runway, its technical characteristics allows handling Boeing 737 and Airbus A320 size airliners. Currently, the reconstruction of the airfield complex of the second stage, which is expanding its capacity for reception and service of most modern passenger and luxury types of aircraft.

Airlines and destinations

Support intermodal transportation of passengers
Voronezh Airport supports intermodal free transportation of passengers for 13 regions of the country. Any passenger is delivered to the airport for free.

References

External links

Voronezh International Airport official website  

 International airport Voronezh (Chertovitskoye)

Airports built in the Soviet Union
Airports in Voronezh Oblast
Airports established in 1933